Brejão is a municipality/city in the state of Pernambuco in Brazil. The population in 2020 was 8,987 and the total area is 159.79 km2.

Geography

 State - Pernambuco
 Region - Agreste of Pernambuco
 Boundaries - Garanhuns   (N and E);  Lagoa do Carro   (S);   Terezinha   (W).
 Area - 159.79 km2
 Elevation - 788 m
 Hydrography - Mundaú River
 Vegetation - Subcaducifólia forest
 Climate  -  Tropical hot and humid
 Annual average temperature - 22.0 c
 Distance to Recife - 244 km

Economy

The main economic activities in Brejão are related with agribusiness, especially creations of cattle; and plantations of beans, manioc, coffee and tobacco.

Economic Indicators

Economy by Sector
2006

Health Indicators

References

Municipalities in Pernambuco